Asota iodamia is a moth of the family Erebidae first described by Gottlieb August Wilhelm Herrich-Schäffer in 1854. It is found in the Australian states of New South Wales and Queensland.

The wingspan is about 50 mm.

The larvae feed on the leaves of various figs, including Ficus macrophylla. At first, the caterpillars are communal. They skeletonise the undersides of the leaf. Later they separate.

References
Zwier, Jaap. "Asota iodamia Herrich Schäffer 1854". Aganainae (Snouted Tigers). Retrieved 5 August 2019.

Asota (moth)
Moths of Australia
Moths described in 1854